Callaghan Lake Provincial Park is a provincial park in British Columbia, Canada, located in the upper Callaghan Valley to the west of the resort town of Whistler. The dormant volcano Mount Callaghan overlooks the lake on its north side, while just to the south of the park is the sliding events facility for the 2010 Olympics.

Callaghan Lake was to be the site of the base village for a proposed ski resort, Powder Mountain Resort, but the project never went through due to alleged interference by William Vander Zalm and others in the then-Social Credit government.

The park was established in 1997 and expanded in 2000, currently totalling approximately 2,691 hectares.

References

External links 

 Callaghan Lake Provincial Park

Provincial parks of British Columbia
Sea-to-Sky Corridor
Pacific Ranges
Protected areas established in 1997
1997 establishments in British Columbia